The discography of American singer-songwriter Jimmy Buffett consists of 29 studio albums, 9 compilation albums, 14 live albums, 8 specialty albums, and 67 singles over the last 52 years. Buffett is known for his unique style of music called "Gulf and Western", which combines elements of country, folk rock, pop, and Caribbean, with tropical lyrical themes. Buffett has sold over 20 million albums worldwide, and he has a net worth of $550 million.

Studio albums

1970s

1980s

1990s

2000s

2010s

2020s

Live albums

Compilation and specialty albums

Singles

1960s and 1970s
{| class="wikitable plainrowheaders" style="text-align:center;"
|-
! rowspan="2"| Year
! rowspan="2" style="width:24em;"| Single
! colspan="7"| Peak chart positions
! rowspan="2"| Album
|- style="font-size:smaller;"
! width="45"| US Country
! width="45"| US
! width="45"| US AC
! width="45"| AUS
! width="45"| CAN Country
! width="45"| CAN
! width="45"| CAN AC
|-
| 1969
! scope="row"| "Don't Bring Me Candy"
| —
| —
| —
| —
| —
| —
| —
| 
|-
| rowspan="3"| 1970
! scope="row"| "The Christian?"
| —
| —
| —
| —
| —
| —
| —
| align="left" rowspan="3"| Down to Earth
|-
! scope="row"| "Ellis Dee (He Ain't Free)"
| —
| —
| —
| —
| —
| —
| —
|-
! scope="row"| "Captain America"
| —
| —
| —
| —
| —
| —
| —
|-
| rowspan="4"| 1973
! scope="row"| "The Great Filling Station Holdup"
| 58
| —
| —
| —
| —
| —
| —
| align="left" rowspan="4"| A White Sport Coatand a Pink Crustacean
|-
! scope="row"| "They Don't Dance Like Carmen No More"
| —
| —
| —
| —
| —
| —
| —
|-
! scope="row"| "Grapefruit-Juicy Fruit"
| —
| —
| 23
| —
| —
| —
| 47
|-
! scope="row"| "He Went to Paris"
| —
| —
| —
| —
| —
| —
| —
|-
| rowspan="3"| 1974
! scope="row"| "Saxophones"
| —
| 105
| —
| —
| —
| —
| —
| align="left" rowspan="3"| Living & Dying in ¾ Time
|-
! scope="row"| "Come Monday"
| 58
| 30
| 3
| 19
| —
| 23
| —
|-
! scope="row"| "Pencil Thin Mustache"
| 58
| 101
| 44
| 99
| —
| 75
| 22
|-
| rowspan="2"| 1975
! scope="row"| "A Pirate Looks at Forty"
| —
| 101
| —
| —
| —
| —
| —
| align="left" rowspan="2"| A1A
|-
! scope="row"| "Door Number Three"
| 88
| 102
| —
| —
| —
| —
| —
|-
| rowspan="3"| 1976
! scope="row"| "Havana Daydreamin'"
| —
| —
| —
| —
| —
| —
| —
| align="left" rowspan="3"| Havana Daydreamin|-
! scope="row"| "The Captain and the Kid"
| —
| —
| —
| —
| —
| —
| —
|-
! scope="row"| "Woman Goin' Crazy on Caroline Street"
| —
| —
| —
| —
| —
| —
| —
|-
| rowspan="2"| 1977
! scope="row"| "Margaritaville"
| 13
| 8
| 1
| 98
| 8
| 4
| 1
| align="left" rowspan="2"| Changes in Latitudes,Changes in Attitudes
|-
! scope="row"| "Changes in Latitudes, Changes in Attitudes"
| 24
| 37
| 11
| —
| 21
| 34
| 6
|-
| rowspan="3"| 1978
! scope="row"| "Cheeseburger in Paradise"
| —
| 32
| —
| —
| —
| 24
| —
| align="left" rowspan="3"| Son of a Son of a Sailor
|-
! scope="row"| "Livingston Saturday Night"
| 91
| 52
| —
| —
| —
| 66
| 25
|-
! scope="row"| "Mañana"
| —
| 84
| —
| —
| —
| 97
| —
|-
| rowspan="4"| 1979
! scope="row"| "Fins"
| —
| 35
| 42
| 100
| 62
| 64
| 35
| align="left" rowspan="4"| Volcano
|-
! scope="row"| "Dreamsicle"
| —
| —
| —
| —
| —
| —
|-
! scope="row"| "Volcano"
| —
| 66
| 43
| —
| —
| 1
|-
! scope="row"| "Survive"
| —
| 77
| —
| —
| —
| 10
|-
| colspan="10" style="font-size: 85%"| "—" denotes releases that did not chart
|}

1980s

1990s

2000s

Other singles

Guest singles

Other charted songs

Music videos

Notes

A^''' Volcano also peaked at number 9 on the RPM'' Country Albums chart in Canada.

References

External links

Country music discographies
Discographies of American artists
Rock music discographies
Pop music discographies
Discography